Gandarvakottai is a state assembly constituency in Pudukkottai district of Tamil Nadu. It was in existence from 1957 to 1971 state elections, and reappeared from 2011. It is a part of Tiruchirappalli parliamentary constituency. It is one of the 234 State Legislative Assembly Constituencies in Tamil Nadu, in India.

Madras State

Tamil Nadu

Post Delimitation 
Gandarvakottai (SC) constituency is formed again after constituency delimitations 2008. It is included in the Tiruchirappalli parliamentary constituency.

Election Results

2021

2016

2011

1971

1967

1962

1957

References 

 

Assembly constituencies of Tamil Nadu